Fleda Brown (born 1944 in Columbia, Missouri) is an American poet and author. She is also known as Fleda Brown Jackson.

Biography
Fleda Brown was born in Columbia, Missouri, and raised in Fayetteville, Arkansas. In 1978 she joined the University of Delaware English Department. There she founded the Poets in the Schools Program, which she directed for more than twelve years. She served as poet laureate of Delaware from 2001 to 2007, when she retired from the University of Delaware and moved to Traverse City, Michigan. She currently teaches in the Rainier Writing Workshop, a low-residency MFA program at Pacific Lutheran University in Tacoma, Washington. Her husband, Jerry Beasley, is also a retired English professor.

One of Brown's poems, "If I Were a Swan", has been set for choir by Kevin Puts.

Education
Ph.D. (English, Pre-1900 American Literature), University of Arkansas, Fayetteville, Arkansas, 1983
M.A. (English), University of Arkansas, Fayetteville, Arkansas, 1976
B.A. (English), University of Arkansas, Fayetteville, Arkansas, 1969

Bibliography

Poetry
The woods are on fire : new and selected poems, Lincoln : University of Nebraska Press, 2017. , 
Reunion (University of Wisconsin Press, 2007) ,  – won 2007 Felix Pollak Prize in Poetry
The Women Who Loved Elvis All Their Lives (Carnegie-Mellon University Press, 2004) , 
Breathing In Breathing Out (Anhinga Press, 2002) – won 2001 Philip Levine Prize for Poetry
Devil's Child (Carnegie-Mellon University Press, 1998) , 
The Earliest House (chapbook, Kutztown University, 1994)
Do Not Peel the Birches (Purdue University Press, 1993)
The Eleusinian Mysteries MS (poems and images: limited edition artbook, The Moment Press, 1992) – with Norman Sasowsky
Fishing with Blood (Purdue University Press, 1988) ,  – won the Great Lakes Colleges New Writer’s Award

Anthologies

On the Mason-Dixon Line: An Anthology of Contemporary Delaware Writers (University of Delaware Press, 2008) – co-edited with Billie Travalini
Critical Essays on D.H. Lawrence (G. K. Hall & Company, 1988) – co-edited with Dennis Jackson

References

External links

 The Fleda Brown Web Site
 Poetry and Politics
 Fleda Brown: Poet Laureate, Professor of English

1944 births
Living people
American women poets
Pacific Lutheran University faculty
Writers from Columbia, Missouri
People from Fayetteville, Arkansas
University of Arkansas alumni
University of Delaware faculty
Poets from Arkansas
Poets from Delaware
Poets from Missouri
20th-century American poets
20th-century American women writers
21st-century American poets
21st-century American women writers
American women academics
Poets Laureate of Delaware